The Jackson Post Office in Jackson, Kentucky, at the intersection of Hawk and Broadway, was built in 1916.  It was listed on the National Register of Historic Places in 1990.

It is a three-story rectangular light brown brick building.  The building, whose design is credited to Oscar Wenderoth, cost $85,000 to build.  Besides the post office, it housed a federal courthouse, an Army Recruiting Station, and a county health board.  The post office and federal court offices have since relocated away.

Now used as apartments.

References

Post office buildings on the National Register of Historic Places in Kentucky
Government buildings completed in 1916
National Register of Historic Places in Breathitt County, Kentucky
1916 establishments in Kentucky
Late 19th and Early 20th Century American Movements architecture
Apartment buildings in Kentucky